Dr. Flavius Brown House is a historic home located at Summersville, Nicholas County, West Virginia.  It was built in 1925, and is a two-story Classical Revival style frame dwelling with a hipped roof.  It features a two-story, gabled portico with slender, two-story Doric order columns.

It was listed on the National Register of Historic Places in 2003.

References

Houses on the National Register of Historic Places in West Virginia
Neoclassical architecture in West Virginia
Houses completed in 1925
Houses in Nicholas County, West Virginia
National Register of Historic Places in Nicholas County, West Virginia